Ionut Radu is Romanian goalkeeper playing in Ligue 1

Ionuț Andrei Radu (born 28 May 1997), known as Ionuț Radu or Andrei Radu, is a Romanian professional footballer who plays as a goalkeeper for  club Auxerre, on loan from Serie A club Inter Milan, and the Romania national team.

Radu began his professional career at Inter Milan, his senior output during his first stint consisting of only one match. He was loaned to Avellino in 2017, and the following year joined Genoa also on loan but with an obligation to buy. In the summer of 2019, the Nerazzurri activated his buy-back clause before loaning him again to the latter club and then to Parma, Cremonese and Auxerre.

In international football, Radu led Romania under-21 to the semi-finals of the 2019 UEFA European Championship as their captain. That year, he was awarded the Romanian Footballer of the Year trophy.

Club career

Early career and Inter Milan
Radu began playing football at age eight with local Viitorul București, after his grandmother read a newspaper announcement. He was transferred to FC Steaua București in 2008, and left the club for rival side Dinamo București three years later. In 2013, he relocated to Italy by briefly joining Pergolettese at the start of the year and then being assigned to Inter Milan's junior squads in the summer.

On 14 May 2016, during the last matchday of the campaign, Radu made his senior debut for Inter by entering as a 72nd-minute substitute for Juan Pablo Carrizo in a 3–1 Serie A away defeat to Sassuolo. On 4 October that year, he penned down a new four-season deal with the Nerazzurri which would have run until June 2020.

Radu agreed to a one-year loan at Serie B club Avellino with an option to buy on 15 July 2017. He made his debut in the second round of the Coppa Italia, a 1–0 home win over Matera on 6 August. On 18 September, he made his Serie B debut in a 1–1 home draw with Venezia, and on 24 October kept his first clean sheet in a 1–0 home win over Pro Vercelli. Radu ended his loan with the Biancoverdi  with 24 appearances, five clean sheets and 30 conceded goals.

Genoa

2018–2019: Breakthrough season
On 29 June 2018, 21-year-old Radu was loaned to Genoa with an obligation to join them on a full transfer the following season. Genoa Chairman Enrico Preziosi claimed the subsequent fee was €9 million, which made Radu the most expensive Romanian goalkeeper, while the financial report of Inter showed €8 million. The deal also included an undisclosed buy-back clause.

After Federico Marchetti was used as a starter in the first four games of the 2018–19 season, Radu made his debut on 26 September against Chievo in the Serie A, managing to keep a clean sheet in the 2–0 victory. He was deemed at fault for several goals his team conceded in the next fixtures, including Cristiano Ronaldo's opener in a 1–1 draw with Juventus on 20 October and Alessio Romagnoli's late volley in a 2–1 loss to AC Milan on the 31st the same month; he was however encouraged by manager Ivan Jurić, who blamed young age as the source of his errors. On 3 November, he conceded five goals in a loss to his parent club Inter.

Radu was nominated for Gazeta Sporturilors 2018 Romanian Footballer of the Year award in late November. On 22 December, he saved one of the two penalty kicks awarded to Atalanta in a 3–1 home victory at the Stadio Luigi Ferraris. In January 2019, he was included by UEFA.com in a list of the 50 Best Young Footballers to watch for that year. Radu managed to stay the first-choice goalkeeper under three managers, and amassed 33 league appearances throughout the season.

2019–2020: Return and fall out of favour
In June 2019, after Genoa paid the transfer fee for Radu's permanent move, he was immediately bought back by Inter Milan for €12 million. He however continued at Genoa on another loan.

In December, Radu was announced as the recipient of the 2019 Romanian Footballer of the Year award by the Gazeta Sporturilor daily. He appeared in 17 Serie A games before leaving Genoa in the 2020 winter transfer window, as a result of some unconvincing performances.

Return to Inter Milan
Inter Milan loaned Radu out to Parma for the remainder of the 2019–20 season, but he did not play in any game during his stint at the Stadio Ennio Tardini. The next campaign, he appeared in two Serie A matches for Inter as they became national champions of Italy for the first time in 11 years.

In a rare start on 27 April 2022, Radu committed an error which allowed Nicola Sansone to score the winner in a 2–1 league loss to Bologna. That result dropped Inter to second place in the table, where they remained for the rest of the season behind eventual champions AC Milan.

On 8 July 2022, Radu joined Cremonese on a season-long loan. On 25 January 2023, he moved on a new loan to Auxerre in France.

International career
Radu is a former Romania youth international at under-21 level, featuring for the side in the 2019 UEFA European Championship qualifiers. He made his debut on 13 June 2017, in a 2–0 away win over Liechtenstein. Radu captained both of the group matches in September 2018, saving a penalty to preserve a win against Portugal and keeping a clean sheet in a victory over Bosnia and Herzegovina. The following month, Tricolorii mici finished on top of the group and qualified for the final tournament.

In May 2019, Radu was called up to the Romania senior squad for the approaching UEFA Euro 2020 qualifiers against Norway and Malta, but was not handed his full debut. In June, he started in all three group fixtures of the UEFA Under-21 Euro in Italy, keeping a clean sheet in a draw against France which secured the first place for his nation. Romania were eventually eliminated by defending champions Germany in the semi-finals, after a 4–2 loss.

Personal life
Radu had an elder sister, who died in 2006 at age 14; he used to wear a t-shirt with a picture of her under the kit during the time he was a junior. He is the cousin of defender Andrei Radu, with whom he shares the same name.

Career statistics

Club

International

HonoursInter MilanSerie A: 2020–21
Coppa Italia: 2021–22
Supercoppa Italiana: 2021Individual'''Gazeta Sporturilor'' Romanian Footballer of the Year: 2019

References

External links

1997 births
Living people
Footballers from Bucharest
Romanian footballers
Association football goalkeepers
Serie A players
Serie B players
Ligue 1 players
Inter Milan players
U.S. Avellino 1912 players
Genoa C.F.C. players
Parma Calcio 1913 players
U.S. Cremonese players
AJ Auxerre players
Romania under-21 international footballers
Romania international footballers
Romanian expatriate footballers
Expatriate footballers in Italy
Romanian expatriate sportspeople in Italy
Expatriate footballers in France
Romanian expatriate sportspeople in France